Ron Willems (born 20 September 1966 in Vaassen, Gelderland) is a former Dutch footballer.

During his career he played for PEC Zwolle, FC Twente, AFC Ajax, Grasshopper Club Zürich, and Derby County F.C., where he made 26 appearances and scored 2 goals in the Premier League.

His relative Menno Willems was also a professional footballer.

External links

1966 births
Living people
People from Epe, Netherlands
Expatriate footballers in England
Expatriate footballers in Switzerland
Dutch footballers
Dutch expatriate footballers
Eredivisie players
Premier League players
PEC Zwolle players
FC Twente players
AFC Ajax players
Grasshopper Club Zürich players
Derby County F.C. players
Association football forwards
Footballers from Gelderland
Dutch expatriate sportspeople in Switzerland
Dutch expatriate sportspeople in England